Abronia villosa is a species of sand-verbena known by the common names desert sand-verbena and chaparral sand-verbena. It is in the four o'clock plant family (Nyctaginaceae). It is native to sandy areas in the deserts of the southwestern United States and northern Mexico, associated with creosote-bush and coastal-sage scrub habitats.

Description 
Abronia villosa is a short, hairy annual wildflower which grows in creeping prostrate masses along the ground. It has oval-shaped dull green leaves and many peduncles bearing rounded inflorescences of bright magenta or purplish-pink flowers. It grows in the sand of the deserts and coastlines. It has a very sweet fragrance, and is also very sticky. They usually grow between February and May.

Chemistry 
The rotenoids abronione and boeravinone C, and the terpenoid lupeol can be found in A. villosa.

References

Further reading

External links 

 Abronia villosa — CalPhotos photo gallery

villosa
Flora of Arizona
Flora of Baja California
Flora of California
Flora of Sonora
Flora of the California desert regions
Flora of the Sonoran Deserts
Natural history of the Colorado Desert
Natural history of the Mojave Desert
Taxa named by Sereno Watson
Flora without expected TNC conservation status